The Real McCoy II is a ferryboat that has operated since 2011 from Rio Vista, California on the Ryer Island Ferry route as part of California State Route 84, operated by the California Department of Transportation. It replaced the original Real McCoy in 2011.  It operates 24 hours per day, 7 days per week, three trips per hour, over the 800 foot gap in California State Route 84 in the Sacramento River delta, between Ryer Island and Rio Vista.
Real McCoy II is 88 feet long by 38 feet wide, has a capacity of 80,000 pounds, and can carry up to ten vehicles. There is a 16.25-ton weight limit, tractor-trailers are prohibited, and the length limit is at the discretion of the Coast Guard.

Notes

Ferries on the California highway system
Transportation in Solano County, California
2011 ships